A.A.A is the eponymous debut EP by Nigerian alternative rock band A.A.A. It was recorded at Blackstar Studios in Ikoyi and released independently on August 5, 2019. The band is composed of singer Brymo, guitarist Jad Moukarim, drummer Adey Omotade, and bassist Laughter. A.A.A comprises five tracks and is a fusion of folk music, psychedelic rock and African rhythms; it was mixed and mastered by Mikky Me Joses.

Composition
In the folk and rock-tinged track "Johnbull", Brymo introduces listeners to a nominal character who left home in search of a better life. The song features an electric guitar riff by Jad Moukarim; its title is derived from a popular nursery rhyme. The rock-infused track "Mary Had an Orgasm" is about a titular lady who ends up having sexual relations with a man she hires to show her around the city. In the soulful ballad "Take Me Back to November", Brymo pleads to be taken back to a time when he had the trust of a loved one; the song also depicts a time when his relationship with the person was in good standing. In "Golden Eyes", Brymo is haunted by the ghost of the dead relationship depicted in the previous track. On the EP's closing track "The in-Between", he encourages listeners to keep persevering, pushing and striving.

Critical reception
A.A.A received positive reviews from music critics. A writer for Filter Free Nigeria awarded the EP 4.3 stars out of 5, praising its sound curation, production, thematic style and lyrics. The writer also said the EP "carries Brymo away from the enclosure of his usual sound to a slightly more upbeat realm while still maintaining the otherworldliness of his lyrics". Adewojumi Aderemi of Konbini Channels called A.A.A a "universal body of work" and characterized it as a "refreshing exploration of a plethora of sounds that we simply aren't used to hearing". Music critic Michael Kolawole said A.A.A is a "decent experimental piece, a litmus test that foretells what Brymo’s next project may sound like. It's a show of Brymo tenacity, a testament to his songwriting skill and vocal phrasing".

Track listing

Notes
  signifies an additional producer

Personnel
Credits adapted from a press release posted on Jaguda.com.
Ọlawale Ọlọfọrọ – lead vocals, production 
Jad Moukarim – lead guitar, production 
Adey Omotade – drums, production 
Laughter – bass guitar, production 
Mikky Me Joses – mixing, mastering, additional production

Release history

References

2019 debut EPs